List of barracks of the Slovenian Armed Forces, including barracks that have been abandoned:

Large barracks 
 Jernej Molan Barracks (Cerklje ob Krki)
 Edvard Peperko Barracks (Ljubljana) 
 General Rudolf Maister Barracks (Maribor) 
 26 October Barracks (Vrhnika) 
 Kranj Barracks (Kranj) 
 Franc Uršič Barracks (Novo Mesto)
 Baron Andrej Čehovin Barracks (Postojna)
 Slovenian Territorial Defence Barracks (Ljubljana)
 Cadeten Institut Maribor Barracks

Small barracks 
 Bršljin Barracks (Celje) 
 Bohinjska Bela Barracks 
 Janko Premrl - Vojko Barracks (Vipava) 
 Murska Sobota Barracks (Murska Sobota)
 Stanislav Požar Barracks (Pivka)
 Ptuj Barracks (Ptuj)
 Vincenc Repnik Barracks (Slovenska Bistrica)
 Slovenian Naval Barracks (Ankaran)
 Ajševica Barracks (Nova Gorica)

Barracks in Slovenia